Baptisia alba, commonly called white wild indigo or  white false indigo, is a herbaceous perennial plant in the bean family Fabaceae. It is native in central and eastern North America.

There are two varieties, Baptisia alba var. alba and Baptisia alba var. macrophylla.

Description
Leaves have alternate arrangement, and are trifoliate, narrow, and oblong. White flowers occur from a long spike inflorescence. Blooming occurs from April to July, earlier in the southern part of the range. The species is native to grasslands, but is grown in some gardens. It favors moist soils.

Baptisia alba var. alba (syn. B. pendula) can be differentiated from B. alba var. macrophylla (syn. B. lactea and B. leucantha) on the basis that the former occurs only in the southeastern US and has fruits that hang downward when ripe.

Baptisia alba is described as a facultative upland plant in all parts of its range.

Ecology
B. alba is a host plant for caterpillars of the  wild indigo duskywing butterfly and the  indigo stem borer moth. Bumblebees pollinate the flowers.

Toxicity
The species can be fatal to cows that ingest the plant. It can cause irritation to humans and is possibly poisonous.

References

Sophoreae
Flora of the Great Lakes region (North America)
Flora of the Great Plains (North America)
Flora of the Northeastern United States
Flora of the Southeastern United States
Flora without expected TNC conservation status